The Companies and Intellectual Property Commission (CIPC) is an agency of the Department of Trade and Industry in South Africa. The CIPC was established by the Companies Act, 2008 (Act No. 71 of 2008) as a juristic person to function as an organ of state within the public administration, but as an institution outside the public service.

History

When the 2008 Companies Act came into effect on 1 May 2011, the CIPC was created from the merger of Companies and Intellectual Property Registration Office (CIPRO) and the Office of Company and Intellectual Property Enforcement (OCIPE).

The first months of operation were marked by inefficiency, poor service and large backlogs as the organisation struggled to overcome the legacy of its dysfunctional predecessor, CIPRO.

In April 2013 it was described as "groaning under its own burden of registration under the Companies Act" and suffering from "administrative failures".

In September 2014 the CIPC's new website, intended to automate several routine administrative processes, was criticised as dysfunctional, followed by revelations that the site had no security measures to protect confidential client information.

Functions
The CIPC is responsible for the following functions:
 Registration of Companies, Co-operatives and Intellectual Property Rights (trademarks, patents, designs and copyright) and maintenance thereof
 To disclose Information on its business registers
 To promote education and awareness of Company and Intellectual Property Law
 To promote compliance with relevant legislation 
 Efficiently and effectively enforce relevant legislation 
 Monitor compliance with, and contraventions of financial reporting standards, and make recommendations thereto to Financial Reporting Standards Council (FRSC) 
 Licensing of Business rescue practitioners 
 Report, research and advise the Minister on matters of national policy relating to company and intellectual property law.

References

External links
 cipc.co.za

2011 establishments in South Africa
Government agencies of South Africa
Intellectual property organizations